Ganapathy Vanthachi is a 2006 Indian Tamil language comedy drama film directed by K. S. Saravanan. The film stars newcomers Udhai, Rajesh and Mathisha, with Shanmugasundaram, Charle, Pandu, P. Soundara Rajan, Balendran and Viji Ketti playing supporting roles. The film, produced by Media Jeyeshkumar, was released on 15 December 2006.

Plot
The film begins with the little girl Abhi and her grandfather Shanmugasundaram (Shanmugasundaram) walking along the beach. Abhi moves away from her grandfather and drowned at the beach. The kind-hearted young man Ganapathy (Udhai) who witnesses it saves Abhi from drowning. Thereafter, Abhi meets Ganapathy who is cleaning the temple and her grandmother Kamalam thanks him for saving her granddaughter's life that day and takes Ganapathy home. At her home, Ganapathy says that he is an orphan who does odd jobs for a living and Shanmugasundaram offers him a job in his big house filled with children. The new servant Ganapathy easily wins the hearts of the children in a short period of time.

Everything goes well until Ganapathy meets Raghupathi (Rajesh) who tries to enter in Shanmugasundaram's house. A few years ago, in Mumbai, the poor Ganapathy struggles to find a job and the terrorist Raghupathi gives him an assignment. Ganapathy did it triumphantly but when he came to know about Raghupathi's identity, he was shocked and immediately left Mumbai. Raghupathi turns out to be Shanmugasundaram's long-lost son and he wants to stay in his father's house to hide from the police. But Ganapathy beats Raghupathi up and drives him away during the absence of Shanmugasundaram. Later, Shanmugasundaram's family friend Jyothi (Mathisha), a college student, falls in love with Ganapathy and proposes her love to him but the faithful Ganapathy who has a lot of respect for Shanmugasundaram refuses to fall in love with her.

Raghupathi comes back again to the house and Shanmugasundaram welcomes him with open arms. Raghupathi tells Shanmugasundaram that Ganapathy throws him out when Shanmugasundaram wasn't home and Shanmugasundaram orders him to throw Ganapathy out of the house, and he does so. The children who like him so much cannot forget him. Afterwards, Raghupathi has a fight with the other terrorists and Ganapathy comes to his rescue. During the fight, Ganapathy is stabbed and Raghupathi fled from the place. Later that night, Jyothi who sees the unconscious Ganapathy on the middle of the street takes him to the hospital. Raghupathi then tells everything to his father and a guilty Shanmugasundaram goes to the hospital with his family. A few days later, a healed Ganapathy returns to their house and promises that he will never leave them.

Cast

Udhai as Ganapathy
Rajesh as Raghupathi
Mathisha as Jyothi
Shanmugasundaram as Shanmugasundaram
Charle as Mani
Pandu as Vaithi
Soundar as Vaithi's brother
Balendran as Kesavan
Viji Ketti as Kamalam
Sundari
Jayashree as Meena
Jeyabashini
Baby Mona as Abhi
Randeep
Mani
Gundu Shankar
Sanjana
Jeevanandam
Ragul
Kovai Senthil as Iyer

Production
P. C. Guna made his directorial debut with Ganapathy Vanthachi under the banner of Prime Movie Makers. P. C. Guna was also in charge of story, screenplay, dialogues, and cinematography. Newcomer Udhai was selected to play the lead role while newcomer Mathisha was chosen to play his love interest. Rajesh was cast to play the second lead role. The director said, "the story revolved around an orphan Ganapathy. He finds employment as a servant in a house filled with children. The children love him. At one point, he gets thrown out of the house. The children are unable to forget him. Why he is thrown out, whether he comes back and who are responsible for his problems form the climax".

Soundtrack

The film score and the soundtrack were composed by Prasad and Ganesh. The audio was released in June 2006, director S. P. Muthuraman released the first cassette and CD and producer A. M. Rathnam received it.

Reception
S. R. Ashok Kumar of The Hindu said, "Udhay as Ganapathi has done a good job, showing the right emotions at the right time. It is a cakewalk for the seasoned artistes, Shanmugasundaram and Pandu. Charlie, with his potential for both sentiment and humour, has not been fully utilised. Madisha is yet to learn the ropes of acting" and concluded with, "the director has lost all the good work put in by the actors and also the technicians mainly due to inept handling of the story".

References

2006 films
2000s Tamil-language films
Indian comedy-drama films
2006 directorial debut films